AEIOU-TIPS is a mnemonic acronym used by some medical professionals to recall the possible causes for altered mental status.  Medical literature discusses its utility in determining differential diagnoses in various special populations presenting with altered mental status including infants, children, adolescents, and the elderly.  The mnemonic also frequently appears in textbooks and reference books regarding emergency medicine in a variety of settings, from the emergency department and standard emergency medical services to wilderness medicine.

The acronym

References

Medical mnemonics
Mnemonic acronyms